Maria Theurl (born August 11, 1966) is an Austrian cross country skier who competed from 1988 to 2000. She won a bronze medal in the 15 km at the 1999 FIS Nordic World Ski Championships in Ramsau.

Theurl's best individual finish at the Winter Olympics was 6th in the 30 km at Nagano in 1998. She also competed at the 1988 Winter Olympics. She won four individual events at 5 km in Austria from 1993 to 1999 during her career.

Cross-country skiing results
All results are sourced from the International Ski Federation (FIS).

Olympic Games

World Championships
 1 medal – (1 bronze)

World Cup

Season standings

Individual podiums

1 podium

Note:  Until the 1999 World Championships, World Championship races were included in the World Cup scoring system.

References

External links

1966 births
Living people
Austrian female cross-country skiers
Cross-country skiers at the 1988 Winter Olympics
Cross-country skiers at the 1998 Winter Olympics
FIS Nordic World Ski Championships medalists in cross-country skiing
Olympic cross-country skiers of Austria
20th-century Austrian women